Leushkanovo is a rural locality (a village) in Vereshchaginsky District, Perm Krai, Russia. The population was 120 as of 2010.

Geography 
Leushkanovo is located 28 km west of Vereshchagino (the district's administrative centre) by road. Putino is the nearest rural locality.

References 

Rural localities in Vereshchaginsky District